Delta Power Equipment Corp. designs, manufactures and distributes power woodworking tools under the Delta Machinery brand.

History
Delta traces its roots to the Delta Specialty Company founded by Herbert Tautz in 1919 in Milwaukee, Wisconsin. Based at first in Tautz' garage, Delta Specialty Company thrived, first making small tools for home shops and later expanding into light industrial machinery.

In 1945, Rockwell Manufacturing Company acquired Delta Machinery and renamed it the Delta Power Tool Division of Rockwell Manufacturing Company and continued to manufacture in Milwaukee.

In 1966, Rockwell invented the world's first power miter saw.

In 1981, Rockwell's power tool group was acquired by Pentair and re-branded Delta Machinery.

In 2004, Pentair's Tools group was acquired by Black & Decker.

Current ownership
In January, 2011, Taiwan-based Chang Type Industrial Co., Ltd. purchased the Delta brand from Stanley Black & Decker. Chang Type formed a wholly owned subsidiary, Delta Power Equipment Corp. to own the acquired assets including trademarks, designs and industrial tooling. Chang Type is moving Delta's production tooling from a Stanley Black & Decker owned facility in Jackson, Tennessee to a facility in Anderson County, South Carolina. Most recently, Delta has purchased an improved facility in Spartanburg, SC and has moved all operations to this location.

References

External links
 Delta official website
 Delta history at Vintage Machinery
 Dewalt Random Orbit Sander

Power tool manufacturers
Manufacturing companies established in 1919
1945 mergers and acquisitions
1981 mergers and acquisitions
2004 mergers and acquisitions
2011 mergers and acquisitions
Tool manufacturing companies of the United States